Marovoay may refer to several places in Madagascar:

 Marovoay, Alaotra-Mangoro - a village in Aloatra-Mangoro
 Marovoay, a town and commune in Marovoay District, Boeny Region.
 Marovoay Banlieue, a town and commune in Marovoay District, Boeny Region.
 Marovoay Sud, a town and commune in Besalampy District, Melaky Region.
 Marovoay District, a district in Boeny Region.